René Rebuffat (10 September 1930 – 31 November 2019) was a French historian and archaeologist, specializing in ancient Africa. He conducted archaeological excavations at Thamusida in Morocco,  Gholaia in Libya, and in the Sebou basin in Morocco. He also worked on archaeological sites of Aléria and Jublains.

Career 
A student of the École normale supérieure (class 1952), then a member of the École française de Rome (1959), he was detached to the service of Antiquities of Morocco (1961) where he began his scientific career. He entered the CNRS in 1963, which he left in 1998 with the title of Emeritus Research Director.

In historical linguistics, he contributed since 2002 to research on linguistic practices of ancient North Africa, and among others to research on Numidian language inscriptions.

Publications (partial list)
 Le complexe fortifié de Jublains [collaborations], J. Naveau, Recherches sur Jublains et sur la cité des Diablintes, 1997
 Thamusida I, II, III, [collaborations], Collection de l'Ecole Française de Rome, 1965, 1970, 1977, 1977
 Aires sémantiques des principaux mots libyques, in MEFRA 118/1, 2006, p. 267-295

See also 
 Jublains archeological site

References

External links 
 René Rebuffat on data.bnf.fr
 Resume on Archeo.ens
 Peinture et inscriptions on Persée
 René Rebuffat with collaboration by Gilbert Hallier and Jean Marion, Thamusida II - Fouilles du service des antiquites du Maroc on Persée

French archaeologists
École Normale Supérieure alumni
2019 deaths
1930 births
20th-century French historians
21st-century French male writers
21st-century French historians
20th-century French male writers
French National Centre for Scientific Research scientists
Historians of Africa
Historical linguists